Mogudu is a 2011 Indian Telugu-language drama film produced by Nallamalapu Srinivas (Bujji) on Lakshmi Narasimha Productions banner and directed by Krishna Vamsi. Starring Gopichand, Taapsee Pannu  with Rajendra Prasad, Roja in supporting roles with music composed by Babu Shankar as his debut. The film recorded as utter flop at box office. The film is all about how a man truly becomes husband when he understands his wife and wins her love. The film released on 4 November 2011.

Plot
Bujji (Gopichand) is the only son of a wealthy and influential farmer Anjaneya Prasad (Rajendra Prasad). The family is well knit together and has strong values and attachments. Bujji comes across Raja Rajeshwari (Taapsee Pannu) in unexpected circumstances and falls in love with her. Raja is the daughter of a powerful politician Chamundeshwari (Roja) and Shankar Rao (Naresh). The families agree to the marriage and just when everything seems nice and happy, unexpected circumstances cause a rift between them. Into this scenario comes Jo (Shraddha Das), who is madly in love with Bujji. This further escalates the tensions. The rest of the movie is about whether Bujji sorts out the differences between the families and wins his wife back.

Cast

 Gopichand as Ramprasad "Bujji" 
 Taapsee Pannu as Raja Rajeshwari "Raji"
 Shraddha Das as Jo
 Rajendra Prasad as Anjaneya Prasad 
 Roja as Chamundeshwari 
 Naresh as Shankar Rao
 Ahuti Prasad
 Venu Madhav as Venu Babu
 Krishnudu
 Praveen
 Narsing Yadav
 Maharshi Raghava as Lawyer Sridhar
 Harsha Vardhan as Dr. Sagar
 Geethanjali 
 Lakshmi Bhargavi as Sarada
 Jaya Lakshmi as Dr. Gauthami
 Ramya Nittala as Bhagamati
 Sarayu
 Mast Ali

Soundtrack

Music was composed by Babu Shankar. Music was released on Aditya Music. The audio was launched at Rock Heights, Hyderabad, for which several film stars attended. D. Suresh Babu unveiled the logo of the film. Rajendra Prasad released the first look trailer of the flick. NTR unveiled the audio CD and presented the first album to V. V. Vinayak.

Critical reception
Oneindia.in stated "Mogudu is a film that shows the values of a joint family, friendship, responsibility, love, and affection etc. Krishna Vamsi succeeds partly in his mission. The trademark Krishna Vamsi style and magic is missing in the film. The movie may appeal family audience. Mogudu is a mixed bag and the fans of Krishna Vamsi will not be fully satisfied with it". Rediff which gave a two stars said "Krishnavamsi's fascination for the family and for tradition is given full play in the film. The decibel levels are high: everyone is either shouting, screaming or hitting everyone else. Dialogues are tacky and it's all just one big high-voltage melodrama. On the whole, a disappointing film. NDTV said "The film is just an above average fare. It is a disappointment for the director's ardent fans who expect much from his films. However praised the lead performances, saying "Gopi Chand looks stylish in his designer wear. He is good in action sequences and shows his talent as a performer. But, it is Rajendra Prasad who steals the show with his stellar performance".

Deepa Garimella of fullhyd.com praised the film's screenplay and the casting but said that the movie is a "disappointing, unfulfilling anecdote of a newly-wed husband and a wife dealing with an unpleasant family fracas", rating it 5 out of 10.

References

External links
 

2011 films
2010s Telugu-language films
Indian romantic drama films
Films directed by Krishna Vamsi
Indian family films
Films about marriage
2011 romantic drama films